Trenton James Bray (born September 28, 1982) is an American football coach and former linebacker.

Playing career
Bray was a standout linebacker for the Oregon State Beavers from 2002 to 2005, starting 34 of 49 career games. As a junior in 2004, he collected 122 tackles and was named Second-Team All-Pac-10. He also earned Insight Bowl Defensive MVP honors by making an Oregon State-bowl record 10 tackles in a victory over Notre Dame. He was selected a co-captain of the Beaver football team as a senior, and he backed it up with another terrific season, recording 116 tackles and earning First-Team All-Pac-10 honors. Bray finished his collegiate career with 337 tackles, the sixth-highest total in Oregon State history, 29.0 tackles for loss and 10.5 sacks while making 33 consecutive starts over his final three seasons in Corvallis.

Coaching career
Bray began his coaching career as a graduate assistant for Dennis Erickson at Arizona State in 2008.

He spent 2009 as linebackers coach for the California Redwoods of the United Football League (UFL).

Bray was named interim head coach at Nebraska following the firing of Mike Riley on November 25, 2017. He was relieved of interim duties at Nebraska after they hired Head Coach Scott Frost on December 2, 2017.

Bray was hired in 2018 as the linebackers coach at Oregon State. Midway through the 2021 season he was promoted to interim defensive coordinator after the firing of Tim Tibesar. The interim title was removed after the regular season.

References

External links
 Oregon State profile

1982 births
Living people
People from Flagstaff, Arizona
Players of American football from Arizona
American football linebackers
Oregon State Beavers football players
Hamburg Sea Devils players
Coaches of American football from Arizona
Arizona State Sun Devils football coaches
Sacramento Mountain Lions coaches
Oregon State Beavers football coaches
Nebraska Cornhuskers football coaches